Palgi or Polagi may refer to:
 Palgi, Hirmand
 Palgi, Zahedan